Bekker Port is a seaport situated in Kopli, Tallinn, Estonia, located on the northeastern coast of the Kopli Bay (part of the Tallinn Bay).

See also

 Transport in Estonia

References

External links
 

Ports and harbours of Estonia
Transport in Tallinn